The Isle of Man national cricket team is the team that represents the Crown dependency of the Isle of Man in international cricket. They became an affiliate member of the International Cricket Council (ICC) in 2004 and an associate member in 2017. In October 2020, the Isle of Man Cricket Association planned to establish its first ever women's team.

History

2018-Present
In April 2018, the ICC decided to grant full Twenty20 International (T20I) status to all its members. Therefore, all Twenty20 matches played between the Isle of Man and other ICC members after 1 January 2019 are full T20I. 

Isle of Man played their first official T20I on 21 August 2020 against Guernsey.

In 2023 the team achieved a record low score in a Twenty20 International game (and all Twenty20 cricket) against Spain, being dismissed for 10 runs. This surpassed the previous record low-score in Twenty20 matches of 15 all out made by Sydney Thunder in 2022.

International competition

Since joining the ICC in 2004 the Isle of Man have the following record in official tournaments:

2005: European Division Three – 8th place
2007: European Division Three – 3rd place
2009: European Division Three – 2nd place
2011: European Division Two – 3rd place
2012: European Division Two – Winners
2013: European Division One – 9th place
2014: European Division Two – 5th place
2018: T20 World Cup Europe Qualifier Group B – 6th place
2022: 2022 ICC Men's T20 World Cup Sub Regional Europe Qualifier Group A - 2nd Place

Four Islands tournament

The Island participated in the Four Islands Tournament with Guernsey, Isle of Wight and Jersey in 2000, 2002 and 2004. Their most successful of which was in 2000 when they beat Jersey and finished as runners up to Guernsey in the final.

2000 – 2nd
2002 – 3rd
2004 – 2nd

Early ICC Era

The Manx cricket team, based in the Isle of Man, joined the ICC in 2004, playing their first ICC affiliated competitions in 2005. Previously the national sides had played fixtures against the MCC, on tour in the UK and against touring sides to the Isle of Man.

The first international engagement for the Isle of Man came in 2005 at the European Affiliates Championship. The side was captained by Rob Webber, with the management team of Dougie Hind and Colin Jones. They finished in eighth place in this tournament, which originally meant a demotion to Division Four in the newly expanded five division European Championship. 

However, when the divisions were announced, the Isle of Man had a place in Division Three for 2007. As they had a year without competitive international cricket in 2006, the Isle of Man arranged two one-day friendly matches against Spain played at La Manga Club Ground at the end of September/beginning of October, both of which they won.

In 2007 under Webber, Jones and coach Harvey Anderson, they finished third in the European Division Three, defeating Belgium, Malta (twice) & Cyprus. They were beaten by Spain in the semi-final by fewer wickets lost after a tie on runs. In the 3/4th play-off they recorded a 7 wicket win over Malta. Details on European Division Three 2007 in Belgium can be found in the European Cricket Tournaments archive –

Gareth Dawson Era

In 2008, The Isle of Man cricket association appointed Gareth Dawson, brother of former test spinner Richard, as head coach of the Isle of Man cricket team. Dawson would be responsible for all age groups ranging from the junior set ups all the way to the full Senior squad. A goal of achieving Associate status within the European Cricket Council and to reach the world cricket leagues was set.

2009 ICC European Division Three Championships (La Manga, Spain)

Dawson took his first Isle of Man senior team to La Manga (Spain) to participate in the European Division Three Championships. The team was :-

Richard Kniveton (Captain) (Crosby)
Nick Hawke (St Johns)
Greg Hawke (St Johns)
Christopher Hawke (St Johns)
Daniel Hawke (St Johns)
Daniel Kniveton (Crosby)
Jonathan Norrington (St Johns)
Gareth Roome (Castletown)
Alex Stokoe (Cronkbourne)
Max Stokoe (Cronkbourne)
Arne Van Den Berg (St Johns)
Robert Webber (Ramsey)
Oliver Webster (Ramsey)
Mark Williams (Castletown)

The team finished second, losing out to Israel. Oliver Webster finished as the island's leading run scorer with 123 runs in five games at an average of 24.60. The island's top wicket taker was Max Stokoe with 10 wickets from five games.

2011 ICC European Division Two European Championships (Belgium)

In 2011, Dawson coached the senior team to a second tournament, the European Division 2 championships in Belgium. The squad was :-

Richard Kniveton (Captain) (Crosby)
Seb Aycock (Castletown)
Ross Berry (Crosby)
Christopher Hawke (St Johns)
Daniel Hawke (Cronkbourne)
Jaco Jansen (St Johns)
Shaun Kelly (Ramsey)
Daniel Kniveton (Crosby)
Peter Lewis (Peel)
Gareth Morris (Castletown)
Gareth Roome (Castletown)
Max Stokoe (Cronkbourne)
Arne Van Den Berg (St Johns)
Oliver Webster (Ramsey)

The Manx senior squad were favourites to progress through to Division one and topped their group with a series of victories. They eventually lost to Austria, having at one point been 10/7, and finished third in the tournament. Gareth Morris ended up the leading batsman in the tournament, amassing 289 runs in 6 games including 141 not out against Cyprus. The island's leading wicket taker was Arne Van Den Berg, who took 12 wickets in 6 games.

2012 ICC European Division Two Championships (Corfu, Greece)

In 2012, dawson coached the senior team to a third tournament, the European Division 2 championships in Corfu, Greece. This time he was assisted by Andrew Parkin Coates. The squad was :-

Richard Kniveton (Captain) (Crosby)
Gareth Dawson(Unattached)
Greg Hawke (St Johns)
Daniel Hawke (Grappenhall)
Daniel Kniveton (Crosby)
Phil Littlejohns (Peel)
Russell Miller (Peel)
Gareth Morris (Castletown)
Gareth Roome (Castletown)
Alex Stokoe (Cronkbourne)
Max Stokoe (Cronkbourne)
Arne Van Den Berg (St Johns)
Oliver Webster (Ramsey)
Mark Williams (Castletown)

The Isle of Man won the ICC European Division Two (T20) tournament in Corfu, earning promotion to Division One in 2013. Gareth Morris was their leading batsman, scoring 275 runs at an average of 39.29, which included three fifties. Arne van den Berg was their leading wicket taker, capturing 11 at just 9.00 apiece, with three of their bowlers featuring in the top five economy rates for the tournament – Van Den Berg (2nd), Dan Hawke (3rd) and Max Stokoe (5th).

2013 ICC European Division One Championships (Sussex, England)

In 2013, Dawson coached the senior team to a fourth tournament, the European Division 1 championships in Sussex, England. Barry Smith was team manager, Andrew Parkin Coates returned as assistant coach.

The squad was:-

Luke Lacey (Captain) (Cronkbourne) 
Matthew Ansell (Cronkbourne)
Daniel Hawke (Peel and St Johns)
Christopher Hawke (Peel and St Johns)
Jaco Jansen (Cronkbourne)
Philip Littlejohns (Peel and St Johns)
Adam McAuley (Cronkbourne)
Garreth Roome (Castletown)
Alexander Stokoe (Cronkbourne)
Max Stokoe (Cronkbourne)
Arne van den Berg (Peel and St Johns)
Carl Wagstaffe (Cronkbourne)
Oliver Webster (Peel)
Mark Williams (Castletown)

The island lost their first two games, by 7 wickets against Denmark and by 20 runs against France. They then beat Germany by 5 runs and Belgium by 5 wickets. A 38-run defeat Jersey led to a 5th-place finish in their group and a place in the 9th–10th place playoff match against Gibraltar, which the Isle of Man won to finish in 9th place.

2014 ICC European Division Two Championships (Essex, England)

In 2014, the island enlisted Phil Unsworth as their new coach, after Dawson decided to take up the role of Gibraltar coach. Unsworth led the team to the European Division 2 championships in Essex, England. Colin Jones took the role of team manager.

The squad was:-

Philip Littlejohns (Captain) (Peel and St Johns) 
Christopher Hawke (Peel and St Johns)
Greg Hawke (Peel and St Johns)
Sam Kebbel (Cronkbourne)
Adam Killey (Cronkbourne)
Daniel Kniveton (Crosby)
Luke Lacey (Cronkbourne)
Adam McAuley (Cronkbourne)
Alexander Stokoe (Cronkbourne)
Max Stokoe (Cronkbourne)
Arne van den Berg (Peel and St Johns)
Gareth Morris (Castletown)
Oliver Webster (Peel and St Johns)
Wicus Wessels (Castletown)

The island's first game was against Norway, in what was the first encounter between the two teams. The Isle of Man batted first and under the lights on a damp and humid evening scored a below par 116. Luke Lacey top scoring with 23. In response Norway reached the target with four balls to spare with 40-year-old opener Zaheer Ashiq leading the way, striking two clean sixes in an innings of 33.

Greig Wright Era

 ICC Men's T20 World Cup Sub Regional Europe Qualifier Sweden 2016

The Isle of Man National team currently competed in ICC Europe Division 2.
These competitions are run bi-annually and played in T20 formats. After only playing three games, with one win and two losses. The team wasn't able to progress onto the next round.

The 2016 squad for the competition based in Sweden is:
P Littlejohn - (Captain) (Peel & St Johns)
A McAuley (Cronkbourne)
O Webster (Peel & St Johns)
D Kniveton (Crosby)
C Hawke (Peel & St Johns)
A Killey (Cronkbourne)
D Hawke (Peel & St Johns)
N White (Peel & St Johns)
M Ansell (Cronkbourne)
S Mills (Cronkbourne)
K Cawte (Peel & St Johns)
G Burrows (Finch Hill)
A Van Den Berg (Peel & St Johns)
vN Knights (Cronkbourne)

ICC Men's T20 World Cup Sub Regional Europe Qualifier Holland 2018

On day 1 after a close lose to Belgium in game 1 in the final over. Then a rain affected win against Finland. Isle of Man weren't badly placed. However three further defeats to Jersey, Spain and Italy. Meant the Isle of Man finished bottom on net run rate.

The 2018 squad for the competition based in Sweden is:
M Ansell - Captain (Cronkbourne)
A McAuley (Cronkbourne)
O Webster (Peel & St Johns)
D Kniveton (Crosby)
N White (Peel & St Johns)
C Langford(Crosby)
S Mills (Cronkbourne)
K Cawte (Peel & St Johns)
G Burrows (Finch Hill)
N Knights (Cronkbourne)
C Liebenberg (Cronkbourne)
C Beard (Peel & St Johns)
E Beard (Finch Hill)
J Burrows (Peel & St Johns)

2020 Isle of Man's First T20I fixture
The Isle of Man got 100/9 off 20 overs, with Adam McAuley top scoring with 43 from 50

Guernsey then chased down the total 101/2 off 11.3 overs with Chris Langford being the pick of the bowlers 1/17 (2 Overs)
The Squad was;

Matt Ansell (Captain) (Cronkbourne)
Adam McAuley(Cronkbourne)
Nathan Knights(Cronkbourne)
Ollie Webster(Peel & St Johns)
George Burrows(Finch Hill)
Carl Hartmann (WK)
Chris Langford(Crosby)
Joe Burrows(Finch Hill)
Sam Mills(Cronkbourne)
Corbin Liebenberg(Cronkbourne)
Jacob Butler(Crosby)
Ed Walker(Crosby)
Fraser Clarke(Finch Hill)

 2021 T20i Series in Cyprus

The Isle of Man finished top of the triangular series with four wins from four. Twice beating Cyprus and twice beating Estonia.Game two saw Dollin Jansen make his T20 international debut being the youngest player to play for the Isle of Man and the 9th youngest in the world. Carl Hartmann picked up fielder of the series and Adam McAuley batter of the series. The four wins means the Isle of Man moved up 16 places in the T20 world rankings to 54th in the world.

The squad was;
Matt Ansell (Captain) (Cronkbourne)
Eddie Beard(Peel & St Johns)
George Burrows(Finch Hill)
Joe Burrows(Finch Hill)
Jacob Butler(Crosby)
Fraser Clarke(Finch Hill)
Josh Clough(Cronkbourne)
Carl Hartmann (wk)(Crosby)
Dollin Jansen ( Castletown)
Nathan Knights(Cronkbourne)
Chris Langford(Crosby)
Adam McAuley(Cronkbourne)
Conor Smith 
Al Stokoe(Chingford)
Ed Walker(Crosby)

2022 ICC Men's T20 World Cup Sub Regional Europe Qualifier Group A

The Isle of Man under the guidance of Team Manager Sally Green and Head Coach Greig Wright headed to Finland to compete in the World Cup qualifiers. After not playing in a World Cup Qualifier since 2018 in Holland, where they finished in last position with only one win. The changed Squad had aspirations of winning their group. After a Tri Series Win  in October Time against Cyprus & Estonia, the Squad had built up some confidence. In Finland, they won all four group games,( Cyprus, Serbia, Romania, Turkey) with George Burrows becoming the first Isle of Man batsmen to hit a T20I 50 in the first group game Vs Cyprus. He also hit T20I 50's Against Serbia and Turkey respectively. George was the top run scorer of the competition, which led to him being named player of the tournament. The team climbed to 39th in the world rankings and would face Italy ranked 29th in the final. Italy came out on top and went onto the next  round of qualifying, where they'll face; Austria, Denmark, Germany & Jersey. The team with an average age of 22 did themselves proud and have now won 8 out of 10 T20I fixtures.

Game 1:
CYP innings120 (19.2)
Shoaib Ahmad 25 (23)
Sadun Mahamalage 22 (17)
Joseph Burrows 4/16 (4.0)
Chris Langford 2/27 (4.0)
IMN innings122/2 (14.3)
George Burrows 69 (45)
Adam McAuley 28 (31)
Tejwinder Singh 1/23 (3.0)
Sadun Mahamalage 1/12 (2.0)

Game 2:
IMN innings165/7 (20.0)
George Burrows 60 (46)
Nathan Knights 27 (16)
Ayo Mene-Ejegi 4/30 (4.0)
Alister Gajic 1/37 (4.0)
SER innings97/7 (20.0)
Simo Ivetic 29 (35)
Mark Pavlovic 18 (16)
Matthew Ansell (c)2/10 (4.0)
Chris Langford 2/19 (4.0)

Game 3:
ROM innings120 (19.2)
Vasu Saini 31 (26)
Ramesh Satheesan (c)29 (27)
Jacob Butler 2/19 (3.0)
Kieran Cawte 2/24 (4.0)
IMN innings121/2 (12.2)
Nathan Knights 69 (31)
Adam McAuley (c)27 (33)
Vasu Saini 2/4 (2.0)
Gaurav Mishra 0/19 (2.0)

Game 4:
IMN innings171/9 (20.0)
George Burrows 54 (35)
Edward Beard 35 (22)
Ishak Elec 4/31 (4.0)
Ali Turkmen 1/25 (4.0)
TUR innings97/8 (20.0)
Gokhan Alta (c)28 (27)
Mohammad Ilyas Ataullah 20 (8)
Chris Langford 3/10 (4.0)
Joseph Burrows 2/20 (4.0)

Game 5:
IMN innings101/8 (20.0)
Carl Hartman (wk)30 (30)
George Burrows 20 (27)
Harry Manenti 3/14 (4.0)
Bashar Khan 2/18 (4.0)
ITA innings 102/3 (10.5)
Marcus Campopiano 35 (21)
Justin Mosca 29 (17)
Joseph Burrows 2/28 (3.0)
Dollin Jansen 1/29 (2.5)

The squad was:-
Matthew Ansell (Captain) (Cronkbourne) 
Adam McAuley (Cronkbourne))
Nathan Knights(Cronkbourne)
Josh Clough(Cronkbourne)
George Burrows(Crosby)
Joe Burrows(Crosby)
Chris Langford (Crosby)
Carl Hartmann (Crosby)
Jacob Buttler (Crosby)
Kieran Cawte (Peel and St Johns)
Eddied Beard (Peel and St Johns)
Dollin Jansen(Castletown)
Fraser Clarke (Finch Hill)
Sam Barnett (Finch Hill)

Records and Statistics

International Match Summary — Isle of Man
 
Last updated 26 February 2023

Twenty20 International 
T20I record versus other nations

Records complete to T20I #2005. Last updated 26 February 2023.

Other results
For a list of selected international matches played by Isle of Man, see Cricket Archive.

See also
 Isle of Man Cricket Association
 List of Isle of Man Twenty20 International cricketers

References

External links
 Isle of Man Cricket website

Isle of Man
Cricket in the Isle of Man
Cricket
Isle of Man in international cricket